Reiff Farm is a historic home and farm complex located in Oley Township, Berks County, Pennsylvania.  The main farmhouse is a -story, five-bay by two-bay, Georgian-style dwelling built of fieldstone.  The property includes a -story, log house built between 1742 and 1800, but possibly as early as 1709, along with a variety of outbuildings.  Outbuildings include an implement shed and workshop, pig barn, combination spring house and smokehouse, summer kitchen and bake oven, ice house, and combination butcher shop and blacksmith shop (1742).  Six of the outbuildings have red clay tile roofs.

It was listed on the National Register of Historic Places in 1982.

References

Farms on the National Register of Historic Places in Pennsylvania
Georgian architecture in Pennsylvania
Houses completed in 1800
Houses in Berks County, Pennsylvania
National Register of Historic Places in Berks County, Pennsylvania
Blacksmith shops